Yang Shiguang (born 1956) is a vice admiral (zhongjiang) of the People's Liberation Army Navy (PLAN) of China. He was director of the PLA Navy Political Department between December 2014 and December 2015.

Biography
Yang was political commissar of Naval Aeronautical Engineering Institute in June 2009, and held that office until March 2012. Then he was commissioned as director of the Political Department of the East Sea Fleet, he remained in that position until December 2014, when he was elevated to director of the PLA Navy Political Department. Yang attained the rank of rear admiral (shaojiang) in July 2010, and was promoted to the rank of vice admiral (zhongjiang) in July 2016.

References

1956 births
Living people
People's Liberation Army Navy admirals